WBFJ-FM (89.3 MHz/Channel 207) is an FM radio station licensed in Winston-Salem, North Carolina, broadcasting a Contemporary Christian format.  It signed on September 1, 1994.

Repeaters

References

External links

BFJ-FM